Bugaboo (The Flea), later published in Spain as La Pulga, is a computer game created in 1983   by the Spanish team of programmers Paco & Paco  for the ZX Spectrum.  Later versions for the Commodore 64, Amstrad and MSX were produced. Bugaboo, besides being the first video game made in Spain, is one of the first computer games to include cut scenes. Its publication marked the official beginning of the Golden Era of Spanish Software. It was ported to the Amstrad CPC under the name Roland in the Caves, to exploit the CPC's recurring Roland character. A sequel was released in Spain by Opera Soft under the title "Poogaboo", made by Paco Suarez, one of the authors of the original game. Paco Portalo, the other member of Paco & Paco, left the project after the publication of the original game for the ZX Spectrum.

The player takes control of a flea who has fallen into a cavern and must escape.

Gameplay 

The game begins with an animation depicting Bugaboo, a small, yellow creature with two extremely long legs, jumping around on a colourful planet before accidentally falling through a crack in the planet's surface and falling to the bottom of a cavern.

The player must control Bugaboo and guide him back to the top of the cavern, and out to the safety of the planet's surface.

There are only two control keys: left and right.  When a key is held down a gauge at the bottom of the screen begins to fill up.  When the key is released, Bugaboo will jump in that direction, with the strength of the jump being determined by how long the key was held down.  The cavern is made up of various rocky ledges which Bugaboo may land on; however he can only stand on a flat area and, if a jump is mistimed, Bugaboo may end up on an angled area of rock, or miss the ledge altogether, which will cause him to fall straight down, landing on whatever is below.

Bugaboo may fall from any distance without dying.  The only way for the player to lose a life is for Bugaboo to make contact with the large, yellow dragon which wanders around the cave.  Bugaboo can escape the dragon by carefully leaping away, or by taking refuge inside one of the smaller caverns that are located around the play area.

Reception 

Reviews were overwhelmingly positive, with CRASH giving the game 92%, Computer and Video Games awarding it 8/10 and their Game of the Month and Personal Computer Games giving it 7/10.

CRASH said that "Bugaboo is a high quality arcade standard game, and it's highly addictive too. This game will definitely be a top seller!" while Personal Computer Games said that "...if you like a challenge, then this is it.  Be patient though. It's not that easy to get back to the top." and Computer and Video Games praised the game's "Breath-taking graphics" and "perfect animation" and decided that "... a fresh and original approach to game design have been combined to produce yet another top rate game." Tony Hetherington of Computer Gamer magazine included the game in "The Spectrum Collection" - "15 classic games that all Spectrum owners should have".

Bugaboo reached number 3 in the Top 10 charts compiled by WH Smith behind Lunar Jetman and Durell's Jungle Trouble.

Innovations and achievements
Technically and artistically, Bugaboo (The Flea) brought some novelties to the world of video games that have since been widely used. Among them we can highlight:

 It was the first to implement a user interface based on click time. 

 It was the first microcomputer video game incorporating a Cutscene.

 It was one of the first games to use full screen scroll.

In addition it was decisive for Amstrad entry into Spain,  and it inaugurated what is known as Golden Era of Spanish Software.

Legacy
The game's popularity spawned the creation of a book in 2009 entitled Bugaboo, un hito en la Historia del software español by Francisco Portalo Calero (i.e., Paco Portalo, one of the original authors of the game) and published by Universidad de Extremadura, which is available online.

References

External links 

Bugaboo, un hito en la historia del Software Español (Spanish, 2009)

1983 video games
Platform games
ZX Spectrum games
MSX games
Commodore 64 games
Roland in the Caves
Quicksilva games
Video games about insects
Video games developed in Spain
Single-player video games